FK Spartak Bánovce nad Bebravou is a Slovak football team, based in the town of Bánovce nad Bebravou. The club was founded in 1931.

References

External links 
Official website 
at europrofit.sk 

Spartak Banovce nad Bebravou
1931 establishments in Slovakia